Lake Loramie State Park is a public recreation area located on the northeast side of Fort Loramie, Ohio. It occupies  on  Lake Loramie and is operated by the Ohio Department of Natural Resources.

History
Lake Loramie was named after French-Canadian trader Pierre-Louis de Lorimier (Anglicized to Peter Loramie), who established a trading post at the mouth of Loramie Creek in 1769. Lake Loramie was constructed in 1844–45 as a storage reservoir supplying water to the Miami-Erie Canal system. In 1949, Lake Loramie was turned over the Division of Parks and Recreation of the Ohio Department of Natural Resources.

Recreation
The park offers fishing, boating, camping, and cabins. Crappie, bluegill, channel catfish, bullheads, carp, and largemouth bass can be found in the lake.

Activities and amenities

External links 
Lake Loramie State Park Ohio Department of Natural Resources
Lake Loramie State Park Map Ohio Department of Natural Resources 

State parks of Ohio
Nature centers in Ohio
Loramie
Protected areas of Auglaize County, Ohio
Protected areas of Shelby County, Ohio
Loramie
Protected areas established in 1949
1949 establishments in Ohio